The Blanchard River is a  tributary of the Auglaize River in northwestern Ohio in the United States. It drains a primarily rural farming area in the watershed of Lake Erie.

It rises in central Hardin County, on the northern outskirts of Kenton. It flows generally north for its first  into eastern Hancock County, where it turns sharply to the west. It flows west through Findlay and past Ottawa.

History 
The river is named for Jean Jacques Blanchard (1720-1802), a French tailor who settled among the Shawnee along the river in 1769. Fort Findlay, an American outpost in the War of 1812, was constructed along the river in 1812 at the site of the present-day city of Findlay.

In 1908, Tell Taylor wrote "Down by the Old Mill Stream", a popular song of the early 20th Century and a barbershop favorite, while sitting on the banks of the Blanchard River.

Around 1939 numerous projects by the Works Progress Administration improved the river near Findlay, including construction of two major bridges, clearing substantial existing pollution, and building a sewage treatment plant to reduce ongoing pollution.

Flooding 
In August 2007 flooding along the Blanchard River caused more than $100 million in damage in Findlay and an estimated $12 million in damage in Ottawa. Flooding in Ottawa is aggravated by the low bridge carrying County Road I-9 in Putnam County. It traps debris, forming a dam during floods. Flooding also caused damage in Findlay in March 2011.

On November 28, 2012, officials from Hancock and Putnam counties traveled to Washington D.C. to lobby for $1.7 million in federal funding to complete phase three of the Blanchard River Flood Mitigation study.

Variant names
According to the Geographic Names Information System, the Blanchard River has also been known as:
 Quegh-tua-wa, in Odawa	
 Queghtuwa, in Odawa	
 Blanchard Fork 	
 Blanchard's Fork 	
 Blanchards Fork 	
 Quegh-tu-wa 	
 Sha-po-qua-te-sepe 	
 Sha-po-qua-te-sepi 	
 Tailor's River 	
 Tailors River

See also
List of rivers of Ohio

References 

Rivers of Ohio
Rivers of Hancock County, Ohio
Rivers of Putnam County, Ohio
Tributaries of Lake Erie